Martina Fritschy (born 22 July 1983) is a Swiss orienteering competitor. She received a bronze medal on the relay at the 2006 World Orienteering Championships in Aarhus. 
She retired from her professional sports career in 2007 and is now an artist working and living in Bern and Zurich, Switzerland.

References

External links
 

1983 births
Living people
Swiss orienteers
Female orienteers
Foot orienteers
World Orienteering Championships medalists
Junior World Orienteering Championships medalists
21st-century Swiss women